Creating Rem Lezar  is a 1989 American children's musical film directed, written, and produced by Scott Zakarin and released direct-to-video.

In 2022, the film was remastered from the original 1 inch master tape and released on DVD and Blu-ray for the first time on September 13, 2022, commemorating the film's 35th anniversary.

Production

Creating Rem Lezar was filmed in a variety of locations in New York state: The Bellmores, New York City, Roslyn and Spring Glen.

Plot

Two children have the same dream about the same imaginary friend, a superhero named Rem Lezar. They paint a mannequin like their dream hero, which comes to life. The children try and find a Quixotic Medallion that will allow him to live longer than a day. Together they traverse New York, finding various characters along the way, such as a dancing quartet who sing to themselves ("Day and Night"). Eventually, they meet the seemingly evil Vorock, a floating entity who threatens them from the sky. However, the character is turned good when the children say that they love Vorock. The children go back home and find that their imaginary Rem Lezar has returned to the form of a mannequin, but Zack still has the Quixotic Medallion. The children go back to sleep with Rem Lezar still on the mind.

Cast 
 Jack Mulcahy as Rem Lezar, policeman
 Courtney Kernaghan as Ashlee
 Allegra Forste as Ashlee (singing double)
 Jonathan Goch as Zack
 Kathleen Gati as Ashlee's mother
 Scott Zakarin as Vorock
 Stewart H. Bruck as Principal
 Evan Abbey, Ed Luparello, Billy Manning, and Johnny O'Hanlon as park quartet
 Devery Gladney as park rapper
 James E. Graseck as park violinist
 Teresa Simpson as school teacher
 Stuart Grodin as Ashlee's father
 Karin Kernaghan as Zack's mother
 Thomas Ritchie as Zack's father
 Jason Erdman as Ashlee's brother

Reception

In 2005, the film came to prominence on the website eBaum's World, with the musical number "Day and Night" (featuring a late-1980s doo-wop group, hip-hop MC and violinist) becoming a viral hit.

Creating Rem Lezar (described as "creepy/fascinating" and "very strange") appeared in a 2014 BuzzFeed listicle of 26 films that Scarecrow Video were  trying to keep available to the public, as a reminder of "how many rare titles are still only available as physical media thanks to market forces, rights issues, corporate wrangling, and other reasons."

Creating Rem Lezar was featured on a 2019 episode of RedLetterMedia's "Best of the Worst" series. The crew voted the film the best video they had watched that night, and have since made it part of their Best of the Worst Hall of Fame.

Scott Zakarin, the film's director, has himself described the film as "a critical success but a commercial failure."

The character of Rem Lezar became incredibly popular with twitch streamer Vinesauce and his online audience, which led to the streamer conducting an interview with the character's actor Jack Mulcahy about the film on August 30th 2022.

References

External links

1980s children's films
1980s musical films
1989 direct-to-video films
American children's musical films
American direct-to-video films
1980s English-language films
1980s American films